"Charlemagne" is a song performed by English rock band Blossoms. The song was released as a digital download in the United Kingdom on 5 October 2015 through Virgin EMI Records as the fourth single from their debut self-titled studio album. It was written by the band, and produced by James Skelly and Rich Turvey. The song has peaked at number 98 on the UK Singles Chart and number 38 on the Scottish Singles Chart.

Music video
A music video to accompany the release of "Charlemagne" was first released onto YouTube on 29 June 2016 at a total length of two minutes and fifty-one seconds.

Track listing

Charts

Certifications

Release history

References

2015 songs
2015 singles
Virgin EMI Records singles
Blossoms (band) songs